The 2017–18 Utah Runnin' Utes men's basketball team represented the University of Utah during the 2017–18 NCAA Division I men's basketball season. The team was led by seventh-year head coach Larry Krystkowiak. They played their home games at the Jon M. Huntsman Center in Salt Lake City, Utah as members of the Pac-12 Conference. They finished the season 23–12, 11–7 in Pac-12 play to finish in a three-way tie for third place. They lost in the quarterfinals of the Pac-12 tournament to Oregon. They were invited to the National Invitation Tournament where they defeated UC Davis, LSU, Saint Mary's, and Western Kentucky to advance to the championship game where they lost to Penn State.

Previous season
The Utes finished the season 20–12, 11–7 in Pac-12 play to finish in fourth place. They lost in the quarterfinals of the Pac-12 tournament to California. They received an invitation to the National Invitation Tournament where they lost in the first round to Boise State.

Off-season

Departures

Incoming transfers

2017 recruiting class

Roster

Schedule and results

|-
!colspan=12 style=| Exhibition

|-
!colspan=12 style=| Non-conference regular season

|-
!colspan=12 style=| Pac-12 regular season

|-
!colspan=12 style=| Pac-12 Tournament

|-
!colspan=12 style=| NIT

References

2017–18 Pac-12 Conference men's basketball season
2017-18 team
Utah Utes
Utah Utes
Utah